Mihailo Ilić (26 November 1845 – 5 September 1876) was a Serbian officer, military writer, scientist and translator.

He spoke German, Russian and French and was a member of the Serbian Learned Society. His works served as textbooks for military schools. He died in the battle of Jankov vrh (1,492 m above sea level), on Mount Javor, near Ivanjica, in the First Serbian–Turkish War.

A monument to Major Ilić was erected at the Memorial Cemetery on Mount Javor on 24 June 1907.

References

External links
 SANU bio 

1845 births
1876 deaths
People from Jagodina
Serbian–Turkish Wars (1876–1878)
People from the Principality of Serbia
Members of the Serbian Learned Society
Serbian military personnel killed in action
Burials at Belgrade New Cemetery